Toralf Sandø (April 6, 1899 in Flatanger – March 4, 1970) was a Norwegian film director and actor. He also read Olav Duun books for NRK Radio.

Selected filmography
 1936: Vi bygger landet
 1937: By og land hand i hand
 1937: To levende og en død
 1938: Bør Børson Jr.
 1941: Den forsvundne pølsemaker
 1942: Det æ'kke te å tru
 1944: Kommer du, Elsa?
 1952: Trine!

External links

1899 births
1970 deaths
Norwegian male film actors
Norwegian film directors
20th-century Norwegian male actors
People from Flatanger